Diderma cinereum is a species of slime mould in the family Didymiaceae, first described by Andrew Price Morgan in 1894, from specimen(s) found in the Miami Valley on old wood and leaves.

Description
Morgan describes it:

References

External links 
 Images & description of Diderma cinereum at DiscoverLife

Taxa described in 1894
Myxogastria